The women's T12 100 metres competition of the athletics events at the 2015 Parapan American Games was held between August 10 and 11 at the CIBC Athletics Stadium. The defending Parapan American Games champion was Daineris Mijans of Cuba.

Records
Prior to this competition, the existing records were as follows:

Schedule
All times are Central Standard Time (UTC-6).

Results
All times are shown in seconds.

Semifinals
The fastest from each heat and next two overall fastest qualified for the final.

Semifinal 1
Wind: +1.3 m/s

Semifinal 2
Wind: +1.7 m/s

Final
Wind: +3.7 m/s

References

Athletics at the 2015 Parapan American Games